Karl Geiger (born 11 February 1993) is a German ski jumper who has competed at World Cup level since 2012. He won gold medals in both the team and mixed team competitions at the 2021 Nordic World Ski Championships and an individual gold medal at the 2021 Ski Flying World Championships. Geiger represented Germany at the 2018 and 2022 Winter Olympics. In the World Cup, he finished runner-up in the 2020 and 2022 seasons.

Career
His career-best achievements include winning a team silver medal at the 2018 Winter Olympics as well as individual silver, team, and mixed team gold at the FIS Nordic World Ski Championships 2019.

On 12 December 2020, Geiger achieved the gold medal of the 2020 Ski Flying World Championships. He became the ski flying World Champion beating Halvor Egner Granerud and Markus Eisenbichler.

Geiger's debut in FIS Ski Jumping World Cup took place in November 2012 in Lillehammer. On 15 December 2018 in Engelberg, Geiger won a World Cup competition for the first time in his career. On 16 February 2019, he achieved his second World Cup victory in Willingen, Germany.

Record

Olympic Games

FIS World Nordic Ski Championships

FIS Ski Flying World Championships

World Cup

Season standings

Individual wins

Team victories

Individual starts

Podiums

References

External links

1993 births
Living people
German male ski jumpers
Olympic ski jumpers of Germany
Ski jumpers at the 2018 Winter Olympics
Ski jumpers at the 2022 Winter Olympics
Medalists at the 2018 Winter Olympics
Medalists at the 2022 Winter Olympics
Olympic silver medalists for Germany
Olympic bronze medalists for Germany
Olympic medalists in ski jumping
FIS Nordic World Ski Championships medalists in ski jumping
People from Oberstdorf
Sportspeople from Swabia (Bavaria)